Juan Manuel Torres, better known as Chaco Torres (born 20 June 1985 in Puerto Vilelas, Chaco), is a retired Argentine football midfielder.

Career
Former player of Argentine clubs Racing Club and San Lorenzo de Almagro (Buenos Aires), Torres made his professional debut in 2002 in the age of 17, he went on to make over 100 appearances for each of the Argentine club.

Torres was part of the Argentina U-20 team, along with such players as Lionel Messi, Sergio Agüero and Pablo Zabaleta, that won the 2005 FIFA World Youth Championship.

In summer 2005, the management of Dynamo Kiev attempted to buy the young and promising FIFA World Youth Champion Juan Manuel Torres Racing Club. However, the Racing Club management were not as eager to release one of their key players, although the Torres was expressing a desire for leaving. Inter alia, the parties could not agree on money issues.

On June 24, 2011, he signed a three-year contract with Metalist Kharkiv as a free agent. Both times Chaco moved to a new club, on a free transfer (as a free agent). He offered his services to Metalist Kharkiv, at the time being out of contract.

Aktobe
In January 2017, Torres signed for Kazakhstan Premier League side FC Aktobe, leaving the club by mutual consent on 15 June 2017.

Career statistics

Honours

Country
Argentina U-20
FIFA World Youth Champion (1): 2005

Personal life 
Torres has two children: a daughter with his first wife Ailyn Lobato, and a son with the actress Catalina Artusi.
In September 2012, the Argentine fashion model Ivanna Palliotti left Buenos Aires and moved to Kharkiv for her boyfriend, the player of Metalist Kharkiv Chaco Torres.

Chaco is the nickname given to him, because he was born in the Argentine province of Chaco.

References

External links
 Argentine Primera statistics at Fútbol XXI  
 
 FC Metalist history and statistics 
 

1985 births
Living people
Sportspeople from Chaco Province
Argentine footballers
Argentina under-20 international footballers
Association football midfielders
Racing Club de Avellaneda footballers
San Lorenzo de Almagro footballers
FC Metalist Kharkiv players
Argentine Primera División players
Ukrainian Premier League players
Argentine expatriate footballers
Expatriate footballers in Ukraine
Argentine expatriate sportspeople in Ukraine
FC Aktobe players
Expatriate footballers in Kazakhstan
Argentine expatriate sportspeople in Kazakhstan